Oscar W. Lofton (born April 2, 1938) is a former American football player and coach.  He served as the head football coach at Southeastern Louisiana University from 1980 to 1985, compiling a record of 30–34–1.

Professional career
Lofton played end for the Boston Patriots of the American Football League (AFL) in 1960. He scored the second touchdown in franchise history on a 60-yard pass play. He was drafted for military service and missed the 1961 and 1962 seasons. He returned to play for the Patriots but suffered a hamstring injury in training camp and never played another snap in pro football.

Coaching career
Lofton was the 11th head football coach at Southeastern Louisiana University in Hammond, Louisiana and he held that position for six seasons, from 1980 until 1985.  His coaching record at Southeastern Louisiana was 30–34–1.  Southeastern Louisiana discontinued its football program after the conclusion of the 1985 season, but reinstated the program in 2003 under head coach Hal Mumme.

Head coaching record

External links
 

1938 births
Living people
American football ends
American men's basketball players
Boston Patriots players
Holy Cross Crusaders football coaches
Southeastern Louisiana Lions football coaches
Southeastern Louisiana Lions football players
Southeastern Louisiana Lions basketball players
Tulane Green Wave football coaches
College men's track and field athletes in the United States
Players of American football from Baton Rouge, Louisiana
Sportspeople from Baton Rouge, Louisiana
People from Franklin County, Mississippi